The PGA Cup is a men's golf competition for club professionals played between a Great Britain and Ireland team and a United States team. The winning team is presented with the Llandudno Trophy. The competition is run by the British PGA and the PGA of America.  It was first played in 1973 and was an annual event until 1984, after which it became biennial.

The 2022 event was held at the Foxhills Golf Club in Surrey, England, the second time that the course had been chosen to host the event. The United States won by five points, to retain the trophy they won in 2019.

History
The first two contests, at Pinehurst, North Carolina in 1973 and 1974, were contested for the Diamondhead Cup. Diamondhead Corp. was the owner of Pinehurst and sponsored the event. From 1975, the event was organised by the two PGAs and became known as the PGA Cup.

In 1990 the event was opened up to the golfers from continental Europe but from 1996 the British PGA team was again restricted to players from Great Britain and Ireland.

The 2017 PGA Cup, the 28th contest, was held on the Longcross course at Foxhills Golf Club, Ottershaw, Surrey from 15 to 17 September and was won by Great Britain and Ireland by a score of 16 to 10, their second successive victory.

The 2019 PGA Cup, the 29th contest, was held on the Fazio Foothills course at Omni Barton Creek Resort & Spa, Austin, Texas from 27 to 29 September and was won by the United States by a score of 14 to 12, their first outright victory since 2011.

Trophy
The trophy was first used for the Llandudno International Golf Trophy contested by the leading professionals from England, Scotland, Ireland and Wales. The first tournament was held in September 1938 and Llandudno council presented a silver trophy to the P.G.A. for the winning team. Percy Alliss, the captain of the winning English team, took possession of the trophy. It was intended that the tournament would be the first of a series of matches but the Second World War interrupted these plans and the contests were not restarted after the war. During Alliss's later years, the trophy was returned to the P.G.A. and was then used as the trophy for the PGA Cup.

Format
The event is contested by teams of ten players over three days, with four foursomes and four fourball matches on each of the first two days, and ten singles matches on the final day. All matches are over 18 holes.

The format of the PGA Cup has changed over the years. In 1973 and 1974 it was a two-day competition but in 1975 the event was expanded to three days. In the initial format only 8 of the 9 players contested the singles but from 1977 the whole team play in this session. From 1980 both foursomes and fourballs have been played on the first two days. The team size was increased from 9 to 10 in 1988 and the format has been unchanged since then, the only variation being the order of the foursomes and fourballs on the first two days.

Results

United States have won 19 times, Great Britain & Ireland 7 times with 4 ties.

Appearances
The following are those who have played in at least one of the matches.

United States

 Rick Acton 1986, 1994
 Jim Albus 1977, 1981, 1982
 Ken Allard 1986
 J. C. Anderson 2013
 Perry Arthur 1996
 Tommy Aycock 1978, 1979, 1980
 Danny Balin 2011, 2019
 Dave Barber 1978, 1980
 Jerry Barber 1974
 Rex Baxter 1974, 1976
 Alex Beach 2019, 2022
 George Bellino 1977
 Frank Bensel Jr. 2022
 Bob Benson 1975
 Steve Benson 1978, 1981
 Ryan Benzel 2007, 2009
 Rich Berberian, Jr. 2017, 2019
 Don Berry 2003
 Scott Bess 1986, 1988
 Michael Block 2015, 2022
 Gene Borek 1973, 1976, 1981, 1983
 Bob Borowicz 1992
 George Bowman 1994
 Bob Boyd 1990, 2000
 Stan Brion 1974
 Jamie Broce 2015, 2017
 Mark Brown 2000, 2017
 Bob Bruno 1973, 1979
 Mike Burke Jr. 1998
 Kevin Burton 2000
 Doug Campbell 1980
 Jason Caron 2019
 Walt Chapman 1994
 Paul Claxton 2017
 Tom Cleaver 1994
 Tim Collins 1977, 1978, 1979, 1984
 Ben Cook 2019
 Richard Crawford 1982
 Stuart Deane 2015
 John DeForest 1996
 Wayne DeFrancesco 2003
 Frank Dobbs 2000
 Matt Dobyns 2013, 2015, 2017
 Sean Dougherty 2015
 Bob Duden 1977
 Tim Dunlavey 2000
 John Elliott, Jr. 1984
 Charlie Epps 1986
 Scott Erdmann 2011
 Barry Evans 2003
 Eddie Famula 1975
 Jim Ferree 1979
 Jim Ferriell 1977
 Gene Fieger 1992, 1998
 Bruce Fleisher 1990
 Kyle Flinton 2009
 Terry Florence 1980, 1984
 Bob Ford 1981, 1984, 1990, 1996, 2005
 Jeff Freeman 2000
 Ray Freeman 1986, 1990
 Dale Fuller 1990
 Brian Gaffney 2000
 Mal Galletta 1973
 Bob Galloway 1977
 Bob Gaus 1998
 John Gentile 1979
 Ernie George 1973
 Gibby Gilbert 1988
 Larry Gilbert 1976, 1977, 1981, 1982, 1983, 1992
 Mike Gill 2000
 Mike Gilmore 2003
 David Glenz 1984, 1988
 Randy Glover 1975, 1976, 1980
 Larkin Gross 2022
 Laurie Hammer 1978
 Phil Hancock 1990
 Scott Hebert 2009
 Denis Husse 1983
 David Hutsell 2011
 Stu Ingraham 1990, 1996
 Bill Israelson 1996
 John Jackson 1981, 1982
 Tommy Jacobs 1974
 Faber Jamerson 2011
 Marty Jertson 2011, 2019
 David Jimenez 1976
 Chip Johnson 2005
 Jared Jones 2022
 Shawn Kelly 2000
 Roger Kennedy 1980, 1981
 Ben Kern 2019
 Darrell Kestner 1998
 Jim King 1983
 Rob Labritz 2003
 George Lanning 1977
 Jeff Lankford 1998
 Brad Lardon 2011
 John Lee 1994
 Bob Lendzion 1983, 1988
 Ron Letellier 1975
 J. L. Lewis 1994
 Jack Lewis Jr. 1980
 Babe Lichardus 1973, 1975
 Eric Lippert 2009
 Jim Logue 1974, 1982, 1983
 Travis Long 2005
 Jay Lumpkin 1988
 Denny Lyons 1973, 1974
 Larry Mancour 1974
 Don Massengale 1973, 1982
 O'Dell Massey 1975
 Rives McBee 1973, 1974, 1976, 1978
 Sean McCarty 2019
 Rob McClellan 2011
 Ron McDougal 1992, 1994, 1998
 Dave McNabb 2017
 Brett Melton 2005
 Bob Menne 1988
 Mark Mielke 1998
 Kelly Mitchum 2013
 John Molenda 1974
 Alan Morin 2003, 2015
 Kevin Morris 1983, 1986
 Jesse Mueller 2022
 Dan Murphy 1984
 Lonnie Nielsen 1988, 1996
 Pete Oakley 1994
 Jay Overton 1979, 1998
 Don Padgett II 1976, 1981, 1982, 1984
 Rod Perry 2013, 2017
 Ron Philo, Jr. 2005, 2007
 Ben Polland 2015, 2022
 Ryan Polzin 2013
 Art Proctor 1978
 Sammy Rachels 1990, 1996
 Adam Rainaud 2017
 Lee Rinker 1992, 2007, 2009
 Tom Robertson 1983
 Gary Robinson 1982
 Jeff Roth 1988, 1994, 1996
 Mike San Filippo 1992
 Steve Schneiter 1996, 2009
 Mike Schuchart 1992
 Alan Schulte 2007
 Bill Schumaker 1986
 Jack Seltzer 1983
 Craig Shankland 1973
 Butch Sheehan 2007
 Mark Sheftic 2009, 2011, 2013
 Jerry Shortridge 1979, 1980
 Sonny Skinner 2009, 2011
 Mike Small 2005, 2007, 2009, 2011, 2013
 Ron Smith 1978
 Todd Smith 1994
 Jack Sommers 1979
 Jeff Sorenson 2013
 Bob Sowards 2005, 2013, 2015, 2019
 Scott Spence 2005
 Josh Speight 2017
 Chris Starkjohann 2007
 Craig Stevens 2003
 Rich Steinmetz 2005
 Wheeler Stewart 1986
 Grant Sturgeon 2015
 Chip Sullivan 2007, 2013
 Bruce Summerhays 1977, 1978
 Tim Thelen 2000, 2003, 2005, 2007
 Craig Thomas 2009
 Kim Thompson 1990
 Jeff Thomsen 1990
 David Thore 1988
 Dennis Tiziani 1976
 John Traub 1981
 Chris Tucker 1998
 Brett Upper 1992
 Omar Uresti 2015, 2017, 2022
 Maurice Ver Brugge 1975
 Steve Veriato 1992
 Ryan Vermeer 2019, 2022
 Robby Ware 1996
 Tom Wargo 1988, 1992
 Roger Watson 1975, 1976
 Larry Webb 1984
 Tim Weinhart 2003
 Jim White 1986
 Buddy Whitten 1980
 Wyatt Worthington II 2022
 Jimmy Wright 1975, 1979, 1982
 Bob Wynn 1984
 Don Yrene 2007
 Bruce Zabriski 1998, 2003

Source:

Great Britain and Ireland
Initially the team was based entirely on the PGA Club Professionals' Championship. The leading nine available players in that event qualified, there being a sudden-death playoff when there was tie for 9th place. In 1973 Adrian Sadler tied for third place but later withdrew and was replaced by Bryon Hutchinson, who had earlier lost a playoff for the final place. In 1974 Ken Redford finished in a qualifying position but had decided not to travel. In 1979 George Will qualified after finishing tied for 3rd position but later withdrew and was replaced by Jim Farmer. In 1980 Brian Waites, who finished third, had previously announced that we would not play in the PGA Cup. There was a three-way tie for 10th place. George Will declined to play in it and Leonard Owens gained the final place by beating Peter Tupling in a playoff. The system remained the same in 1986, even though the event had become biennial.

In 1988 the teams were increased to 10. The selection process was also revised. Eight members of the team gained entry via the PGA Club Professionals' Championship with the captain David Huish having two "wildcard" selections. Huish chose the players who had finished 9th and 10th, Nick Job and John Chillas. In 1990 the event was opened to the golfers from continental Europe. Only seven player qualified from the club professionals' championship, with the winner of European teaching professionals championship at Broekpolder in the Netherlands, gaining a place. There was a three-way tie for two places in the club professionals' championship but the captain Richard Bradbeer announced that he would use one of his wildcard picks for the losing player. so all three were selected. His other pick was Brian Barnes who had not played but had won it the previous year. Dutch-based John Woof gained the final place by winner the Broekpolder event. In 1992 John Chillas and Russell Weir were the wildcard selections with Dutch-based Tim Giles gaining the final place by winning in Broekpolder.

In 1994 the team was selected using a system in which points were allocated in both the 1993 and 1994 PGA Club Professionals' Championships.

 Phillip Archer 2017
 Robert Arnott 2003
 Keith Ashdown 1988
 Andrew Baguley 1994, 2005
 Benn Barham 2013
 Brian Barnes 1990
 Jonathan Barnes 2013
 Will Barnes 2009
 Andrew Barnett 2007, 2009
 Sion Bebb 2000
 Graeme Bell 2003
 Stephen Bennett 1998
 Jon Bevan 2007, 2009
 Alec Bickerdike 1980
 Nicolas Brennan 2013
 Gary Brown 2011
 Nick Brown 1996
 David Butler 1984
 Peter Butler 1978, 1979, 1981, 1982, 1984
 David Callaway 2013
 Bob Cameron 1981, 1983, 1984, 2000, 2003
 Paul Carman 1990, 1996
 Alex Caygill 1974
 John Chillas 1982, 1983, 1984, 1988, 1992
 Cameron Clark 2015
 Lee Clarke 2015
 Robert Coles 2017, 2019
 Ian Collins 1982
 Matthew Cort 2017, 2019, 2022
 Peter Cowen 1992
 David Creamer 1974
 Christopher Currie 2017
 Craig Defoy 1981, 1984
 Kevin Dickens 1998
 Richard Dinsdale 2005
 David Dixon 2015, 2019
 David Dunk 1982, 1983
 Denis Durnian 1981, 1982, 1984, 1986
 John Dwyer 2000, 2003, 2007
 Simon Edwards 2003, 2005, 2011
 Matthew Ellis 2005
 Pip Elson 1986
 Richard Emery 1973
 Brian Evans 1978
 Jim Farmer 1977, 1979, 1980, 1983
 Max Faulkner 1975
 Bill Ferguson 1973, 1976
 Roger Fidler 1975
 Alastair Forsyth 2019
 Graham Fox 2013, 2015
 Ged Furey 1988
 Mike Gallagher 1977
 Andrew George 1998
 Robert Giles 2011
 Tim Giles 1992
 Christopher Gill 2011
 Jordan Godwin 2019
 Craig Goodfellow 2007, 2011
 Martin Gray 1983, 1986, 1988
 John Greaves 1998
 Daniel Greenwood 2013
 Chris Hall 1992, 1994, 2000
 Stephen Hamill 2000
 Andrew Hare 2003
 Jamie Harris 2009
 John Harrison 1994
 Peter Harrison 1980
 Scott Henderson 2013
 Paul Hendriksen 2015
 David Higgins 2017, 2022
 Joe Higgins 1994, 1996
 Philip Hinton 1988
 Vince Hood 1974, 1976
 John Hoskison 1988, 1992
 Garry Houston 2017
 David Huish 1974, 1975, 1977, 1978, 1979, 1980, 1984, 1986
 Greig Hutcheon 2013, 2017, 2022
 Bryon Hutchinson 1973
 Mike Ingham 1976, 1977, 1978, 1983
 David Ingram 1976, 1984
 David Jagger 1980
 Bob Jamieson 1974, 1975
 Nick Job 1988, 1992, 1994, 1996
 David Jones 1976, 1977, 1978, 1979, 1981, 1992, 1994
 Ernie Jones 1976
 Kevin Jones 1988
 Michael Jones 1998
 Niall Kearney 2015
 John Kennedy 2011
 Adam Keogh 2022
 Jimmy Kinsella 1977
 Gordon Law 1996, 2003, 2005
 Craig Lee 2019
 James Lee 2009
 Paul Leonard 1979, 1982
 Jason Levermore 2015, 2019
 Simon Lilly 2022
 Stuart Little 2011
 Bill Longmuir 1996, 2003
 Bob Longworth 1986
 Michael Macara 1998
 Craig Maltman 1992, 1994
 Fraser Mann 1996, 2005
 Robin Mann 1994
 Ashley Mansell 2022
 Craig Matheson 2009
 Christopher McDonnell 2017
 Brendan McGovern 1996, 2003
 Damien McGrane 2000, 2017
 George McKay 1978
 Paul McKechnie 2022
 Steven McKenna 1996
 John McTear 1980
 David Melville 1973
 David Miller 1974
 Willie Milne 1982, 1986
 Tony Minshall 1980, 1983
 John Morgan 1973, 1979, 1981
 David Mortimer 2011
 Bill Murray 1974
 Duncan Muscroft 2007
 Tony Nash 2000, 2005
 Michael Nesbit 2007
 Geoff Norton 1973
 Paul O'Hara 2019
 Leonard Owens 1977, 1980
 Darren Parris 2005
 Andrew Raitt 2017
 Tim Rastall 1990
 Mark Reynolds 2005
 Ian Richardson 1975
 David Ridley 1979, 1981
 Brian Rimmer 1992, 1998
 Jeremy Robinson 2009
 Keith Robson 1986
 James Ruth 2022
 George Ryall 2007
 Adrian Sadler 1975
 Denis Scanlon 1975
 David Scott 1990
 David Screeton 1990
 Doug Sewell 1973, 1974, 1975
 David Shacklady 2011
 John Sharkey 1976
 Paul Simpson 1998, 2009
 Gary Smith 1986
 Kevin Stables 1990
 Gary Stafford 1988
 Mike Steadman 1979, 1981
 Hogan Stott 1994, 2000
 Barry Taylor 2009
 Daniel Taylor 2007
 Gordon Townhill 1977
 Peter Tupling 1978
 Alistair Thomson 1978, 1983
 Simon Thornton 2022
 David Thorp 1980
 David Vaughan 1982, 1984
 Brian Waites 1973, 1975, 1976, 1977, 1978, 1979, 1990
 Richard Wallis 2013, 2019
 Peter Ward 1974, 1976
 Michael Watson 2015
 Phil Weaver 1982, 1983
 Alastair Webster 1990
 Russell Weir 1986, 1988, 1990, 1992, 1994, 1996, 1998, 2000
 John Wells 2011
 Paul Wesselingh 1998, 2000, 2003, 2005, 2007, 2009
 James Whatley 2007
 Daniel Whitby-Smith 2022
 Jack Wilkshire 1973
 John Woof 1990
 Gareth Wright 2013, 2015
 Alex Wrigley 2015, 2019
 John Yeo 1981

Source:

References

External links
Official site of British PGA
Official site of PGA of America
PGA Cup 2018 Media Guide (pdf)

 
Team golf tournaments
Recurring sporting events established in 1973